Anacetrapib is a CETP inhibitor which was being developed to treat elevated cholesterol levels in an effort to prevent cardiovascular disease. In 2017 its development was abandoned by Merck.

Evidence
In 2017 REVEAL trial anacetrapib was shown to decrease the risk of repeat heart attacks in high-risk patients with previous acute coronary events.

See also
Other CETP inhibitors:
 Torcetrapib was developed by Pfizer until December 2006 but caused unacceptable increases in blood pressure and had net cardiovascular detriment.
 Dalcetrapib was developed by Hoffmann–La Roche until May 2012.  It did not raise blood pressure and did raise HDL, but it showed no clinically meaningful efficacy.
 Evacetrapib was developed by Eli Lilly & Company until October 2015.

References

Further reading
 

Trifluoromethyl compounds
2-Oxazolidinones
O-methylated phenols
Experimental drugs
Fluoroarenes
Isopropyl compounds
Abandoned drugs